James Clark Morrison (born 25 May 1986) is a football coach and former professional player who played as a midfielder.  He is widely regarded as one of the greatest West Bromwich Albion midfielders in the club’s history. Morrison is currently a first-team coach at West Bromwich Albion, and played for Middlesbrough and West Bromwich Albion between 2004 and 2019. After representing various England junior sides, Morrison chose to play for Scotland at full international level. He made 46 full international appearances between 2008 and 2017.

Club career

Middlesbrough
Morrison was born in Darlington, County Durham, and attended Hummersknott School. He is a product of Middlesbrough's youth academy. He starred in Middlesbrough's FA Youth Cup winning side in 2003–04, putting in several eye-catching performances throughout the cup run, notably scoring in the final first leg 3–0 win against Aston Villa.

His initial outings in the first team displayed some promise as well. He made his first-team debut on 3 January 2004, coming on as a second-half substitute in a 2–0 FA Cup victory against Notts County. His Premiership debut came four months later, when he replaced Stewart Downing in a 5–1 defeat away at Portsmouth on the final day of the 2003–04 season. Morrison's first European action for Boro was on 30 September 2004 in a UEFA Cup tie away at Banik Ostrava. He marked the occasion by scoring his first goal for the club, a last-minute equaliser that secured a 1–1 draw in the second leg and a 4–1 aggregate victory. Morrison started for Middlesbrough in the 2006 UEFA Cup Final against Sevilla. On 19 March 2007, he was sent off in an FA Cup quarter-final replay against Manchester United for a kick out at Cristiano Ronaldo.

West Bromwich Albion
On 7 August 2007, Morrison signed a four-year contract with West Bromwich Albion, for an initial £1.5 million fee. This fee could rise by a further £700,000, depending on Morrison's appearances for the Baggies. Middlesbrough will also receive 15% of any sell-on fee. Morrison made his Albion debut as a second-half substitute in a 2–1 defeat away at Burnley on the opening day of the 2007–08 season. His first goal for the club was a second half winner in a 2–1 home victory over Blackpool on 23 October 2007, a strike that won him the West Bromwich Albion Supporters Club's Goal of the Season award. Morrison described it at the time as "the best goal I've scored in my career".

Morrison impressed in the first team throughout the 2008–09 season. He scored three goals in total over the course of the season, including his goals home and away against Aston Villa. On New Years Day 2011, he scored a 20-yard volley in a 2–1 defeat against Manchester United.

After numerous impressive displays, on 14 September 2012, Morrison signed a new four-year deal until 2016. For his performances in the 2014–15 season, Morrison won the official supporters player of the year award for the first time.

On 23 August 2015, Morrison scored both of West Bromwich Albion's goals in a 3–2 home defeat to Chelsea, the first two-goal haul of his career and an equalling of his goal tally for the previous season. Earlier in the game, he had a penalty saved by Thibaut Courtois. On 30 June 2016, Morrison signed a new two-year deal with West Brom keeping him at the club until at least the summer of 2018 with a one-year option. He further extended this on 3 August 2018, keeping him at the Hawthorns until 2019. He left the club after the 2018–19 season, with his final appearance coming in a play-off match against Aston Villa.

Morrison said in September 2019 that he was considering retirement, having only received offers from lower league clubs during the summer. On 29 October 2019, Morrison announced his retirement from professional football.

International career

Morrison played at a number of youth levels for England. Along with Leicester City's Steve Howard and Aston Villa's Gabriel Agbonlahor, Morrison was one of a number of English Premier League players identified in June 2007 as being eligible to play for Scotland. He qualifies to play for the team through his grandparents. Morrison later chose to represent Scotland, claiming that he felt his "opportunities with England will be limited".

After receiving international clearance from FIFA, Morrison joined up with the Scotland squad for training in August 2007. He was unable to make his debut in the friendly against South Africa however, due to injury. Morrison was named in the Scotland B squad to face the Republic of Ireland B team in November, but injury forced him to withdraw from the squad again. He finally made his debut in the friendly against the Czech Republic in Prague, on 30 May 2008.

He scored his first goal for Scotland in the 3–1 win against Wales on 25 May 2011 in the Celtic Nations Cup tournament in Dublin. He also scored for Scotland against England in the friendly game at Wembley Stadium on 14 August 2013.

Coaching career
After retiring as a player in October 2019, Morrison started working as a coach in the West Bromwich Albion academy. He was promoted to a first-team coaching role in December 2020, following the appointment of Sam Allardyce as West Brom manager.

Career statistics

Club

International
Source:

Scotland score listed first, score column indicates score after each Morrison goal.

Honours
Middlesbrough
FA Youth Cup: 2003–04
UEFA Cup runner-up: 2005–06

West Bromwich Albion
Football League Championship: 2007–08; runner-up: 2009–10

Individual
West Bromwich Albion Player of the Year: 2014–15
SFWA International Player of the Year: 2011–12

See also
List of Scotland international footballers born outside Scotland
List of Scotland national football team captains
List of sportspeople who competed for more than one nation

References

External links

1986 births
Living people
Footballers from Darlington
English footballers
England youth international footballers
Scottish footballers
Scotland international footballers
Association football midfielders
Middlesbrough F.C. players
West Bromwich Albion F.C. players
Premier League players
English Football League players
Association football coaches
West Bromwich Albion F.C. non-playing staff
English people of Scottish descent
People educated at Hummersknott Academy